Museum of Sea Life at Rethymno was a museum in Rethymno, Crete, Greece. It was located in Arabatzoglou Street in Rethymno, Crete in the old abbey of what is referred to as the old town.

It is now closed, with no apparent plans to reopen.

References

External links
 The Museum of Sea-Life at Rethymno Crete-Kreta.com
 Rethymno - What to see RethymnoAtCrete.com

Rethymno
Natural history museums in Greece
Museums in Crete